is a town located in Aomori Prefecture, Japan. , the town had an estimated population of 16,013 in 7027 households, and a population density of 90 persons per km2.

Geography 
Gonohe is located in the north-eastern part of Sannohe District, approximately 16 kilometres west of Hachinohe City and 10 kilometres southeast of Towada City. The town is adjacent to Hachinohe City to the east, Shingō Village to the west, Nanbu Town to the south, and Towada City, Oirase Town and Rokunohe Town to the north. The land extends 16.8 kilometres east to west and 18.55 kilometres north to south.

The Gonohegawa River, which flows from Mt. Heraidake into the Pacific Ocean, and the Asamizugawa River, which originates from a hot spring swamp to join the Mabechi River, run parallel to each other through the town. While embracing these two rivers, residential areas have formed, and rice fields can be found in the flat areas that benefit from the favourable flows of water. The slightly sloped hillside areas spread to the east of the Ōu Mountains and are utilized as crop fields and apple orchards. Forests occupy more than half of the town's total area.

Neighbouring municipalities
Aomori Prefecture
Hachinohe
Towada
Shingō
Nanbu
Oirase
Rokunohe

Climate
The type of weather most characteristic of the region is the yamase, the easterly winds which bring cold air in summer. In Gonohe, the yamase brings rain and, when such conditions last for a long time, harvests are significantly affected because of the low temperatures and lack of sunshine. However, the town receives relatively less snow than its location in northern Tōhoku would otherwise suggest. The town falls within the Köppen climate classification Cfa.  The average annual temperature in Gonohe is 9.9 °C. The average annual rainfall is 1205 mm with September as the wettest month. The temperatures are highest on average in August, at around 22.8 °C, and lowest in January, at around -2.1 °C.

Demographics
Per Japanese census data, the population of Gonohe has steadily declined over the past 70 years.

History 
The most common meanings of the kanji used in the town's name (五戸) are "five" and "door/gate," respectively. However, in the case of Gonohe (and other similar place names in the region), it is believed that the second character in the name carries the meaning of 'ranch,' with the town name being derived from a numbered fortified stockade system developed by the Nanbu clan who once ruled in the region. In 1189, during the Kamakura period, Nanbu Mitsuyuki, a retainer of Minamoto no Yoritomo from Kai Province was awarded the Nukanobu (糠部) district of far northern Mutsu Province after the defeat of the Northern Fujiwara clan. The land was found to be suitable for raising warhorses, for which the region became famous. The area was part of Hachinohe Domain under the Edo period Tokugawa shogunate.

In April 1889, with the introduction of the modern municipalities  system, the area became Gonohe Village. In November 1915, the village was elevated to town status. In July 1955, Gonohe Town was combined with neighboring Kawauchi and Asada villages; this also included incorporating part of the Tekurabashi area of Nozawa Village and the Toyomauchi area of Toyosaki Village. The town merged with the neighbouring village of Kuraishi on April 1, 2012. In recent years there has been a small community of repatriated Manchukuoan Japanese living in Kuraishi.

Government
Gonohe has a mayor-council form of government with a directly elected mayor and a unicameral town council of 16 members. Tōhoku is part of Sannohe District which contributes three members to the Aomori Prefectural Assembly. In terms of national politics, the town is part of Aomori 2nd district of the lower house of the Diet of Japan.

Local culture 
In its earlier history Gonohe enjoyed a reputation as a breeding centre for horses of exceptional quality, popular amongst the samurai. With the decline of the samurai, Gonohe's horses continued to be bred for their meat. This dish is a specialty of both Gonohe and Kumamoto in southern Kyūshū. After horses, Gonohe is best known for the local popularity of soccer.

Economy 
The key industry of the town is agriculture, with a focus mainly on producing vegetables, rice and livestock. Since the town was designated a new industrial city of the Hachinohe region, inland industries have developed in the Jizodaira Industrial Estate, where 20 companies are now in operation.

Education
Gonohe has four public elementary schools and three public middle schools operated by the town government and one public high school operated by the Aomori Prefectural Board of Education.

International relations
 Bayombong, Nueva Vizcaya Province, Philippines, since 1983
 Okcheon, Chungcheongbuk-do, South Korea since 1997

Recent controversy
On 28 June 2001, the town's Korean "sister city" Okcheon cancelled a planned trip to send students, on an exchange visit to Gonohe in reaction to approvals by the Japanese government of a series of middle school history textbooks that were regarded by Korea as distorting historical facts. The event was preceded by a related incident in April of that year, when a group of Gonohe assemblymen cancelled a planned visit to Korea that May, citing financial difficulties.

Transportation

Railway
The Tōhoku Shinkansen passes through Gonohe, but the town has had no passenger railway services after the discontinuation of the Nambu Junkan Railway in 1968, which previously connected it to Hachinohe.

Highway

Noted residents of Gonohe
Kyōsuke Eto, local war hero
 Masayoshi Miura, professional baseball player
 Makoto Teguramori, professional soccer player
 Hiroshi Teguramori, professional soccer player
 Takahiro Shimotaira, professional soccer player
 Tsuyoshi Furukawa, professional soccer player

References

External links

Official Website 

 
Towns in Aomori Prefecture